The 2021 UCI Urban Cycling World Championships was the fourth edition of the UCI Urban Cycling World Championships, and was held from 4 to 8 June 2021 in Montpellier, France.

The 2021 championships comprised events in freestyle BMX only. Previous editions had included events in cross-country eliminator and trials.

Medal summary

Freestyle BMX

Flatland

Park

Medal table

See also
 2021 UCI BMX World Championships
 2021 UCI Mountain Bike World Championships
 2017 UCI Urban Cycling World Championships
 Cycling at the 2020 Summer Olympics – Women's BMX freestyle
 Cycling at the 2020 Summer Olympics – Men's BMX freestyle

References

External links

UCI
Event page on FISE website
Results

UCI Urban Cycling World Championships
UCI Urban Cycling World Championships
UCI Urban Cycling World Championships
International cycle races hosted by France
Sport in Montpellier
UCI Urban Cycling World Championships